Nancy Ann Norton (born 1964) is a retired United States Navy vice admiral who previously served as the director of the Defense Information Systems Agency. Prior to that, as a flag officer she served as vice director of the same agency.

Norton is the daughter of William James Norton and Judith Bressman Norton. Her step-father, Edward James Becerra, whom her mother married when she was a teen, was a U.S. Marine Corps Master gunnery sergeant who served for over 24 years including two tours in Vietnam. She was raised in Coquille and Roseburg, Oregon and graduated from Roseburg High School in 1982. She earned a B.S. degree in general science from Portland State University in 1986. Norton enlisted in the Navy to earn money for further education and was commissioned in 1987. She later received an M.S. degree in computer science from the Naval Postgraduate School in 1994 and an M.A. degree in national security and strategic studies from the Naval War College in 2008.

Her operational tours at sea include serving as communications officer for Commander, Cruiser Destroyer Group 12 aboard  and for Commander, Naval Forces Europe and Commander, U.S. Sixth Fleet.

Ashore, Norton commanded Naval Computer and Telecommunications Station Bahrain; served three tours on the Office of the Chief of Naval Operations staff; the U.S. Pacific Fleet staff; U.S. Pacific Command staff; as officer-in-charge of Naval Telecommunications Center, Fallon, Nevada; and Naval Communications Area Master Station Eastern Pacific.

Personal life 

Norton is married to retired U.S. Navy officer Bruce Howard Hamilton and they reside in Pasadena, Maryland.

References 

1964 births
Living people
Place of birth missing (living people)
People from Coquille, Oregon
People from Roseburg, Oregon
Portland State University alumni
Naval Postgraduate School alumni
Naval War College alumni
Recipients of the Legion of Merit
Female admirals of the United States Navy
United States Navy vice admirals
Recipients of the Defense Superior Service Medal
Recipients of the Defense Distinguished Service Medal
21st-century American women
Military personnel from Oregon